Bracieux is a French commune in the department of Loir-et-Cher, Centre-Val de Loire.

The Max Vauché's chocolate factory was established in the commune, in 2005.

Population

See also
Communes of the Loir-et-Cher department

References

Communes of Loir-et-Cher